Dilpurra is a village community in the south western part of the Riverina in New South Wales, Australia.

Geography 
Dilpurra is situated about 57 kilometres west of Moulamein and 15 kilometres north of Swan Hill, Victoria.

Heritage listings 
The Coonamit Bridge over Wakool River on Swan Hill Road that connects Dilpurra with neighbouring Mallan is listed on the New South Wales State Heritage Register.

References

External links 

Towns in the Riverina
Towns in New South Wales
Murray River Council